Gushki (also Romanized as Gūshkī; also known as Goshki, Kargūshkī, Qal‘eh-ye Gūshī, Qal‘eh-ye Gūshkī, and Qal‘eh-ye Kūshkī) is a village in Byaban Rural District, Byaban District, Minab County, Hormozgan Province, Iran. At the 2006 census, its population was 251, in 45 families.

References 

Populated places in Minab County